The 1911 International Lawn Tennis Challenge was the tenth edition of what is now known as the Davis Cup, named after the American tennis player Dwight F. Davis. After no country decided to challenge Australasia in 1910, only the British Isles and the United States would challenge for the Cup, for the third straight edition. Also for the third straight edition, the Americans would beat the British to earn the right to play for the Cup, and for the third straight edition, the Aussies would beat the Americans for the title.

For the first time, however, teams were allowed to use substitute players in dead rubbers, with the United States playing Maurice McLoughlin in singles after Australasia had clinched the final. The final also marked the first time a tie was played in New Zealand, when it was played at Lancaster Park in Christchurch. Anthony Wilding, whose home city was Christchurch, and Australian Norman Brookes won the 1907 tournament for Australasia; the first time that America had been beaten in this tournament. With Wilding being absent in Europe for the 1911 competition, the chances of the Australasian team were weakened.

Rain delayed the beginning of the games scheduled for 29 December 1911, and the 1911 Davis Cup event was held between 1 and 3 January 1912. Norman Brookes beat Beals Wright in the opening match. Rodney Heath increased the lead for Australasia by beating William Larned. Australasia retained the Davis Cup through a win in the doubles, with Brookes and Alfred Dunlop being successful over Wright and McLoughlin. The fourth match was defaulted by Wright, and Larned stepped aside to give the younger McLoughlin the opportunity to play Brookes. After leading 2 sets to 1, Brookes came back and won the match, and gave Australasia a clean 5–0 victory.

Final
United States vs. British Isles

Challenge Round

Australasia vs. United States

References

External links
Davis Cup official website

Davis Cups by year
International Lawn Tennis Challenge
International Lawn Tennis Challenge
International Lawn Tennis Challenge